Real Afghan Kabul  is a football team in Afghanistan. They play in the Afghan Premier League.

Current squad

As of  2009.

External links
 http://realafghanfc.s5.com/index.htm

Football clubs in Afghanistan
2003 establishments in Afghanistan